Atom Bank is a retail bank in the United Kingdom. It is the United Kingdom's first bank built for smartphone or tablet, without any branches, and the first digital-only challenger bank to be granted a full UK regulatory licence. The company is based in Durham, England.

Atom is authorised by the Prudential Regulation Authority (PRA) and regulated by the Financial Conduct Authority (FCA) and the PRA.

History

Atom was founded in July 2013 by Anthony Thomson, co-founder of Metro Bank  and Mark Mullen, previous CEO at First Direct.

In June 2015, Atom was granted a banking licence and before launch in November 2015, Spanish bank BBVA agreed to invest a substantial stake in Atom. The company launched to the public in April 2016, after its regulatory authorisation restrictions were lifted, initially to those who had expressed an interest previously and had been given a registration code. It launched more widely in October 2016 and today it offers mortgages and savings accounts, along with secured loans for small businesses.

In 2017, Atom was named by LinkedIn as one of UK's top 25 startups and ranked 14th alongside companies such as Deliveroo, Uber and Airbnb, and in 2019, Atom ranked second in business analyst Beauhurst's list of 50 top fintech UK startups and scale-ups. It was the only company from outside London in the top 20 of the list.

Mobile app

Atom has apps for iOS and Android phones, offering biometric security, with customers able to sign in via face ID or voice ID.

References

External links 

 

Banks of the United Kingdom
Banks established in 2014
Companies based in County Durham